Nana Antwi Manu (born 8 April 1994), sometimes known mononymously as Antwi, is a Ghanaian footballer who plays as a striker for Amanat Baghdad SC of Iraqi Premier League.

Club career

Early career
Born in Kumasi, Ashanti, Antwi began his career at local club Hamburg F.C. before later joining Achiken FC.
On 1 January 2017, Antwi left Achiken FC, to sign a contract with Bechem United. Antwi was with Bechem United from 2017 to 2018, He played a few matches due to injuries.
On 2 February 2018, Antwi left Bechem United, to sign a contract with FC San Pédro.

San Pédro
In February 2018, Antwi's arrival was announced.
Antwi did not have injuries so he became regular in 2018–20 season. Antwi was a key member in FC San Pédro team both in Ligue 1 (Ivory Coast) and CAF Confederation Cup.

Haras El Hodoud
On 1 July 2019, Antwi signed to Haras El Hodoud SC.
Antwi spent a season at Haras El Hodoud SC. He left at the end of the season to join ZED FC formerly FC Masr

Zed FC
On the 24th November, Nana Anwti signed to ZED FC.
Nana Antwi left in September 2021 to join Iraqi Premier League side Amanat Baghdad SC.

Amanat Baghdad SC
On the 15th September, Nana Antwi signed to Amanat Baghdad SC for one season.

Career statistics

Club

References

External links
Ghana Football Association – official website
Footballdatabase

1994 births
People from Kumasi
Living people
Ghanaian footballers
Association football utility players
Association football forwards
Association football midfielders
Bechem United FC players
Haras El Hodoud SC players
Expatriate footballers in Egypt
Ghanaian expatriate footballers
Ghanaian expatriate sportspeople in Egypt
FC San-Pédro players
FC Masr players
Ghanaian expatriate sportspeople in Iraq
Amanat Baghdad players